Power Company is an album by the Eric Burdon Band, released in 1983. It features recordings from the Comeback project. It also features live recordings.

Track listing

Side One 
 "Power Company" (Bernd Gärtig, Bertram Passmann, Eric Burdon, Frank Diez, Jackie Carter, Jean-Jacques Kravetz, Nippy Noya)
 "Devil's Daughter" (Eric Burdon, Iverson Minter)
 "You Can't Kill my Spirit" (Tony Greco, Ranji K. Bedi)
 "Do You Feel It" (Eric Burdon, John Sterling, Pat Couchois)
 "Wicked Man" (George Suranovich, John Sterling, Terry Ryan)

Side Two 
 "Heart Attack" (Chris Couchois, Howard Messer, Pat Couchois)
 "Who Gives a Fuck" (Eric Burdon, John Sterling)
 "Sweet Blood Call" (Iverson Minter)
 "House of the Rising Sun" (Traditional; arranged by Eric Burdon and John Sterling)
 "Comeback" (Traditional; arranged by Eric Burdon and John Sterling)

Personnel 

 Eric Burdon - sung, screamed and growled vocals
 John Sterling - guitar
 Snuffy Walden - guitar
 Steve Goldstein - keyboards
 Ronnie Barron - keyboards
 Terry Wilson - bass guitar
 Tony Braunagel - drums

References

External links

1983 compilation albums
Eric Burdon albums